Lasha Zviadiyevich Imedashvili (born 16 July 1996) is a Russian football player.

Club career
He made his professional debut in the Russian Football National League for FC SKA-Energiya Khabarovsk on 19 July 2014 in a game against FC Khimik Dzerzhinsk.

References

External links
 
 

1996 births
Footballers from Moscow
Living people
Russian footballers
FC SKA-Khabarovsk players
FC Ararat Moscow players
Russian sportspeople of Georgian descent
Russian expatriate footballers
Expatriate footballers in Georgia (country)
Association football forwards